"J'attendais" (meaning "I Was Waiting") is a French-language pop song by Canadian singer Celine Dion, recorded for her album, D'eux (1995). It was written by Jean-Jacques Goldman. In June 1997, "J'attendais" was released as a single in France and Belgium from Dion's live album, Live à Paris (1996).

Background and release
The music video was taken from the concert in Zenith Theatre, Paris. It can be found on the Live à Paris DVD.

The single peaked at number 46 in France. It was the result of releasing "J'attendais" eight months after Live à Paris album debuted on charts. The studio recording of this song was also available on Dion's previous album D'eux, which already sold over 4 million copies in France, becoming the best-selling album ever. "J'attendais" also peaked at number 22 in Belgium Wallonia.

Dion performed the song during her 1995 D'eux Tour.
Sony Music Entertainment released live version of "Je sais pas" as a single in the Netherlands at the same time. It featured "J'attendais" as the B-side.

Formats and track listings
French CD single
"J'attendais" (Live) – 4:58
"J'attendais" (Album Version) – 4:24

Charts

Release history

References

1997 singles
Celine Dion songs
French-language songs
Live singles
Songs written by Jean-Jacques Goldman